Sholagampatti is a village in the Thanjavur taluk of Thanjavur district, Tamil Nadu, India.

Demographics 

As per the 2001 census, Sholagampatti had a total population of 1494 with 730 males and 764 females. The sex ratio was 1047. The literacy rate was 70.86.

References 

 

Villages in Thanjavur district